The following is a list of Guggenheim Fellowships awarded in 1979. Guggenheim Fellowships are American grants that have been awarded annually since 1925 by the John Simon Guggenheim Memorial Foundation to those "who have demonstrated exceptional capacity for productive scholarship or exceptional creative ability in the arts." Each year, the foundation makes several hundred awards in each of two separate competitions: one open to citizens and permanent residents of the United States and Canada and the other to citizens and permanent residents of Latin America and the Caribbean.

1979 U.S. and Canadian Fellows

 Irving Martin Abella, Professor of History, York University: 1979.
 Vito Acconci, artist, Brooklyn, New York: 1979.
 Nina Agabian, Associate Professor of Biochemistry, University of Washington: 1979.
 Jeffrey C. Alexander, Chair, Professor of Sociology, University of California, Los Angeles: 1979.
 Thom Andersen, filmmaker; Visiting Artist, California Institute of the Arts: 1979.
 Jonathan Arons, Professor of Astronomy, University of California, Berkeley: 1979.
 Nina Auerbach, John Welsh Centennial Professor of History and Literature, University of Pennsylvania: 1979.
 Richard Frederick William Bader, Professor of Chemistry, McMaster University: 1979.
 Jean-Loup Baer, Boeing Pennell Professor of Computer Science and Engineering, University of Washington: 1979.
 Robert Ely Bagg, poet and translator; Emeritus Professor of English, University of Massachusetts Amherst: 1979.
 Marshall Baker, Professor of Physics, University of Washington: 1979.
 Paul N. Banks, deceased. Bibliography: 1979.
 Philip C. Bankwitz, Professor Emeritus of History, Trinity College, Hartford: 1979.
 Lance Banning, Professor of History, University of Kentucky: 1979.
 Bernard Barber, Professor Emeritus of Sociology, Barnard College and Graduate Faculties, Columbia University: 1979.
 Elizabeth J. Barber, Professor of Linguistics and Archaeology, Occidental College: 1979.
 Michael A. Becker, Professor of Medicine, University of Chicago: 1979.
 Jere R. Behrman, William R. Kenan, Jr. Professor of Economics, University of Pennsylvania: 1979.
 Benjamin Bennett, Professor of German, University of Virginia: 1979.
 Suzanne Berger, Raphael Dorman and Helen Starbuck Professor of Political Science, Massachusetts Institute of Technology: 1979.
 Frank Bidart, poet; Professor of English, Wellesley College: 1979.
 Chester Biscardi, composer; Chairman, Music Department, Sarah Lawrence College: 1979.
 Phyllis Pray Bober, Leslie Clark Professor in the Humanities, Bryn Mawr College: 1979.
 Felicia Bonaparte, Professor of English, Graduate Center, City University of New York: 1979.
 Charles Clyde Bowden, writer, Tucson, Arizona: 1979.
 Raymond Bowers, deceased. Science: 1979.
 Marjorie O'Rourke Boyle, scholar, Toronto: 1979.
 Kenneth S. Brecher, director, The William Penn Foundation: 1979.
 James O. Breeden, Associate Professor of History, Southern Methodist University: 1979.
 Eugene Brodsky, artist, New York City: 1979, 1987.
 Lowell S. Brown, Professor of Physics, University of Washington: 1979.
 Theodore L. Brown, Emeritus Professor of Chemistry, University of Illinois at Urbana-Champaign: 1979.
 Thomas C. Bruice, Professor of Chemistry, University of California, Santa Barbara: 1979.
 Peter C. Bunnell, David Hunter McAlpin Professor of the History of Photography and Modern Art, Princeton University: 1979.
 Stanley P. Burg, plant physiologist, Miami: 1979.
 John G. Burke, deceased. History of Science: 1979.
 David E. Bynum, Professor of Religious Studies, Cleveland State University: 1979.
 Thomas Byrom, deceased. 19th Century English Literature: 1979.
 Richard Calendar, Professor of Molecular & Cell Biology, University of California, Berkeley: 1979.
 John Carisi, deceased. Music Composition: 1979.
 John Casey, writer, Charlottesville, Virginia: 1979.
 F. Stuart Chapin III, Professor of Integrative Biology, University of California, Berkeley: 1979.
 Eric L. Charnov, Distinguished Professor of Biology, University of New Mexico: 1979.
 Anwar G. Chejne, deceased. Near Eastern Studies: 1979.
 Lucinda Childs, choreographer; Artistic Director, Lucinda Childs Dance Company, New York City: 1979.
 Bruno Civitico, artist, Charleston, South Carolina: 1979.
 Robert M. Coates, Professor of Chemistry, University of Illinois at Urbana-Champaign: 1979.
 James S. Cockburn, Professor of History, University of Maryland at College Park: 1979.
 Robert S. Coe, Professor of Earth Sciences, University of California, Santa Cruz: 1979.
 Linda Connor, photographer; Professor of Photography, San Francisco Art Institute: 1979.
 Frederick A. Cooper, Professor of Art History, University of Minnesota: 1979.
 John M. Cooper, Jr., E. Gordon Fox Professor of American Institutions, University of Wisconsin–Madison: 1979.
 Rose Laub Coser, deceased. Professor Emeritus of Community Medicine and of Sociology, State University of New York at Stony Brook: 1979.
 William J. Courtenay, C. H. Haskins Professor and Hilldale Professor of History, University of Wisconsin–Madison: 1979.
 Barbara Crane, photographer; Emeritus Professor of Photography, School of the Art Institute of Chicago; 1979.
 Robert I. Cukier, Professor of Chemistry, Michigan State University: 1979.
 Jonathan Culler, Class of 1916 Professor of English and Comparative Literature, Cornell University: 1979.
 Robert D. Cumming, Frederick J. E. Woodbridge Professor Emeritus of Philosophy, Columbia University: 1979.
 Allan Cunningham, deceased. British History: 1979.
 Robert Daly, Distinguished Teaching Professor of English, State University of New York at Buffalo: 1979.
 Glyn Dawson, Professor of Pediatrics and Biochemistry, University of Chicago: 1979.
 Don DeLillo, writer, Bronxville, New York: 1979.
 Lloyd Demetrius, Professor of Biology, Harvard University: 1979.
 Donna Dennis, artist; Professor, SUNY Purchase, NY: 1979.
 Pierre Deslongchamps, Professor of Organic Chemistry, University of Sherbrooke: 1979.
 Laddie John Dill, artist, Venice, California: 1979.
 Rudiger Dornbusch, Ford International Professor of Economics, Massachusetts Institute of Technology: 1979.
 Robert C. S. Downs, writer; Emeritus Professor of English, Pennsylvania State University: 1979.
 John Duff, artist, New York City: 1979.
 Joseph J. Duggan, Associate Dean of the Graduate Division and Professor of French and Comparative Literature, University of California, Berkeley: 1979.
 Christopher Durang, playwright, Pipersville, Pennsylvania: 1979.
 B. Curtis Eaves, Professor of Operations Research, Stanford University: 1979.
 Craig Jon Eckhardt, Professor of Chemistry, University of Nebraska-Lincoln: 1979.
 P. D. Elliott, Professor of Mathematics, University of Colorado at Boulder: 1979.
 John Engels, poet; Professor of English, St. Michael's College, Winooski, Vermont: 1979.
 Leon D. Epstein, Hilldale Professor Emeritus of Political Science, University of Wisconsin–Madison: 1979.
 Robert N. Essick, Professor of English, University of California, Riverside: 1979.
 Heinz Eulau, William Bennet Munro Professor Emeritus of Political Science, Stanford University: 1979.
 Irene R. Fairley, Professor of English, Northeastern University: 1979.
 Louis Faurer, artist, New York City: 1979.
 Frederick Feirstein, psychoanalyst, poet, New York City: 1979.
 Charles A. Ferguson, deceased. Professor Emeritus of Linguistics, Stanford University: 1979.
 Hartry H. Field, Professor of Philosophy, University of Southern California: 1979.
 Louise Fishman, artist, New York City: 1979.
 Jack D. Flam, Distinguished Professor of Art and Art History, Brooklyn College, City University of New York: 1979.
 Robert Folkenflik, Professor of English, University of California, Irvine: 1979.
 Robert C. Fried, Professor Emeritus of Political Science, University of California, Los Angeles: 1979.
 John B. Friedman, Professor of English, University of Illinois at Urbana-Champaign: 1979.
 Charles Garabedian, artist; Lecturer in Art, College of Creative Studies, University California, Santa Barbara: 1979.
 Serge Gavronsky, Chair, Professor of French, Barnard College, Columbia University: 1979.
 Haile Gerima, filmmaker; Professor of Film, School of Communications, Howard University: 1979.
 Walter Goffart, Lecturer in History and Senior Research Scientist, Yale University: 1979.
 Dick Goldberg, Playwright, Philadelphia, Pennsylvania: 1979.
 Ward H. Goodenough, University Professor Emeritus, University of Pennsylvania: 1979.
 Douglas Greenberg, President and Director, Chicago Historical Society: 1979.
 Ulf Grenander, Professor of Probability and Statistics and L. Herbert Ballou University Professor of Applied Mathematics, Brown University: 1979.
 Michael Groden, Professor of English, University of Western Ontario: 1979.
 Arthur B. Groos, Professor of German Literature, Medieval Studies, and History of Science, Cornell University: 1979.
 Robert Alan Gross, Forrest D. Murden, Jr. Professor of American Studies and History, College of William and Mary: 1979.
 Herschel I. Grossman, Merton P. Stoltz Professor in the Social Sciences and Professor of Economics, Brown University: 1979.
 Richard I. Gumport, Professor of Biochemistry, University of Illinois at Urbana-Champaign: 1979.
 Mel Gussow, arts critic, The New York Times: 1979.
 Jack K. Hale, Regents Professor Emeritus of Applied Mathematics, Georgia Institute of Technology: 1979.
 Stuart Handwerger, Robert and Mary Shoemaker Professor of Pediatrics, Professor of Anatomy, Neurobiology and Cell Biology, University of Cincinnati Children's Hospital Medical Center: 1979.
 Alexander E. Harris, photographer; Professor of the Practice of Documentary Studies, Duke University: 1979.
 Hilary T. Harris, deceased. Film making: 1979.
 Paul Harris, artist; Professor of Sculpture, California College of Arts and Crafts: 1979.
 Robert Hass, Poet Laureate, United States of America; Professor of English, University of California, Berkeley: 1979.
 Phoebe Helman, deceased. Fine Arts-Sculpture: 1979.
 Louis Henkin, Emeritus Professor of Law, Columbia University: 1979.
 James Hepburn, Charles A. Dana Professor Emeritus of English, Bates College: 1979.
 Jaakko Hintikka, Professor of Philosophy, Boston University: 1979.
 David I. Hirsh, Professor of Biochemistry and Molecular Biophysics, College of Physicians and Surgeons, Columbia University: 1979.
 Michael P. Hlastala, Professor of Medicine and of Physiology and Biophysics, University of Washington: 1979.
 Norman N. Holland, Marston-Milbauer Professor of English, University of Florida: 1979.
 John Hollander, Sterling Professor of English, Yale University: 1979.
 Berthold K. Hölldobler, Alexander Agassiz Professor of Zoology, Harvard University: 1979.
 Elizabeth Gilmore Holt, deceased. Fine Arts Research: 1979.
 David Horowitz, writer, Marina Del Rey, California: 1979.
 Jere Trent Hutcheson, composer; Professor of Composition, Michigan State University: 1979.
 Larry M. Hyman, Professor of Linguistics, University of California, Berkeley: 1979.
 John E. Jackson, Professor of Political Science and of Business Administration, and Research Scientist, Institute for Social Research, University of Michigan: 1979.
 Marius B. Jansen, Professor of Japanese History and East Asian Studies, Princeton University: 1979.
 De Lamar Jensen, Professor Emeritus of History, Brigham Young University: 1979.
 José Olivio Jiménez, Distinguished Professor of Romance Languages, Hunter College, City University of New York: 1979.
 Harold G. Jones, Professor of Spanish, Syracuse University: 1979.
 Horace Freeland Judson, writer: 1979.
 Charles H. Kahn, Professor of Philosophy, University of Pennsylvania: 1979.
 Steven J. Kaltenbach, artist; Associate Professor of Art, California State University, Sacramento: 1979.
 John H. Kareken, Chair, Minnesota Professor of Banking and Finance, University of Minnesota: 1979.
 David M. Katzman, Professor of History, University of Kansas: 1979.
 Stanley Kauffmann, film and theatre critic; Visiting Distinguished Professor of Theater, Hunter College: 1979.
 Herbert B. Keller, Professor of Applied Mathematics, California Institute of Technology: 1979.
 Bryce Kendrick, Emeritus Professor of Biology, University of Waterloo: 1979.
 Kenneth Keniston, Andrew W. Mellon Professor of Human Development, Massachusetts Institute of Technology: 1979.
 Kenneth King, choreographer, New York City: 1979.
 John W. Kingdon, Professor Emeritus of Political Science, University of Michigan: 1979.
 Steven L. Kleiman, Professor of Mathematics, Massachusetts Institute of Technology: 1979.
 Stuart D. Klipper, photographer, Minneapolis: 1979, 1989.
 Georg Nicolaus Knauer, Professor Emeritus of Classical Studies, University of Pennsylvania: 1979.
 David Koblitz, composer; Adjunct Assistant Professor of Humanities, Pratt Institute, Brooklyn, New York: 1979.
 Thomas Koenig, Professor of Chemistry, University of Oregon. 1979.
 Peter Kolchin, Professor of History, University of Delaware: 1979.
 Vladimir J. Konečni, Professor of Psychology, University of California, San Diego: 1979.
 Sam Koperwas, writer, Ventnor, New Jersey: 1979.
 David Kopf, Professor of History, University of Minnesota: 1979.
 Barbara Kopple, filmmaker, New York City: 1979.
 Spiro Kostof, Deceased. Architecture: 1979.
 Abraham D. Kriegel, Professor of History, Memphis State University: 1979.
 Samuel Krislov, Professor of Political Science and Law, University of Minnesota: 1979.
 William Kruskal, Ernest DeWitt Burton Distinguished Service Professor Emeritus of Statistics, University of Chicago: 1979.
 Jeffrey G. Kurtzman, Associate Professor of Music, Shepherd School of Music, Rice University: 1979.
 Bentley Layton, Professor of Religious Studies, Yale University: 1979.
 Richard D. Leppert, Morse Alumni Distinguished Teaching Professor of Humanities, University of Minnesota: 1979.
 Robert J. LeRoy, Professor of Chemistry; Associate Dean of Science for Computing, University of Waterloo: 1979.
 Simon A. Levin, George M. Moffett Professor of Biology, Princeton University: 1979.
 Donald N. Levine, Peter B. Ritzma Professor of Sociology, University of Chicago: 1979.
 Fred J. Levy, Professor of History, University of Washington: 1979.
 Aaron Lewis, Professor of Applied Science, Hebrew University, Jerusalem: 1979.
 Richard C. Lewontin, Alexander Agassiz Professor of Zoology in the Museum of Comparative Zoology and Professor of Biology, Harvard University: 1979.
 Stephen J. Lieberman, Research Associate, University of Pennsylvania Museum: 1979.
 Michael Loew, deceased. Fine Arts: 1979.
 John B. Logan, deceased. Poetry: 1979.
 Wm. Roger Louis, Kerr Professor of English History and Culture, University of Texas at Austin: 1979.
 Tom Lowenstein, writer, Pittsburgh: 1979.
 Elisabeth B. MacDougall, Professor Emeritus of the History of Landscape Architecture, Harvard University, Dumbarton Oaks: 1979.
 Edward P. Mahoney, Professor of Philosophy, Duke University: 1979.
 Kazumi Maki, Professor of Physics, University of Southern California: 1979.
 Ladislav Matejka, Retired Professor of Slavic Languages and Literatures, University of Michigan: 1979.
 David M. Maurice, Professor of Opthlmology, Columbia University: 1979.
 Esther McCoy, deceased. Architecture: 1979.
 Elizabeth N. McCutcheon, Professor of English, University of Hawaii at Manoa: 1979.
 Larry E. McPherson, photographer; Associate Professor of Art, University of Memphis: 1979.
 Wayne A. Meeks, Professor of Religious Studies, Yale University: 1979.
 John M. Merriman, Charles Seymour Professor of History, Yale University: 1979.
 F. Curtis Michel, Andrew Hays Buchanan Professor of Astrophysics, Rice University: 1979.
 Arthur I. Miller, University Professor, University of Lowell; Associate in Physics, Harvard University: 1979.
 Peter Molnar, Senior Research Scientist, Massachusetts Institute of Technology: 1979.
 John Montague, poet; Director of Anglo-Irish and American Studies, University College Cork: 1979.
 Peter B. Moore, Eugene Higgins Professor of Chemistry and Molecular Biophysics and Biochemistry, Yale University: 1979.
 Stefan R. Moore, video artist, New York City: 1979.
 Thomas C. Moser, Professor of English, Stanford University: 1979.
 Howard Frank Mosher, writer, Irasburg, Vermont: 1979.
 Michael C. A. Mott, writer; Professor Emeritus of English, Bowling Green State University; Adjunct Professor of English, College of William & Mary: 1979.
 John F. Nagle, Professor of Physics and Biological Sciences, Carnegie-Mellon University: 1979.
 Manuel Neri, artist, Benica, California; Professor Emeritus of Art, University of California, Davis: 1979.
 Rosalind Newman, choreographer, New York City: 1979.
 Maria Nordman, artist, Santa Monica, California: 1979.
 Robert Offergeld, deceased. Music Research: 1979.
 Thomas A. O'Halloran, Jr., Emeritus Professor of Physics, University of Illinois at Urbana-Champaign: 1979.
 Norman Page, Head, Professor of Modern English Literature, University of Nottingham: 1979.
 Phillip Shaw Paludan, Professor of History, University of Kansas: 1979.
 Jogesh C. Pati, Professor of Physics, University of Maryland at College Park: 1979.
 Richard Pearson, Emeritus Professor of Anthropology and Curator of Archaeology, University of British Columbia: 1979.
 Michael Perman, Professor of History and Research Professor in the Humanities, University of Illinois at Chicago Circle: 1979.
 Hart Perry, filmmaker; Adjunct Assistant Professor of Film, School of the Arts, Columbia University: 1979.
 Warren Porter, Professor of Zoology, University of Wisconsin–Madison: 1979.
 Michael I. Posner, Sackler Institute Professor, Sackler Institute, New York City: 1979.
 Robert T. Powers, Professor of Mathematics and of Physics, University of Pennsylvania: 1979.
 Pietro Pucci, Professor of Classics, Cornell University: 1979.
 Harvey Quaytman, artist, New York City: 1979, 1985.
 John Phillip Reid, Professor of Law, New York University: 1979.
 Jay Reise, composer; Robert Weiss Professor of Music, University of Pennsylvania: 1979.
 Peter B. Rhines, Professor of Oceanograph and Atmospheric Sciences, University of Washington: 1979.
 Phillip C. Rhodes, composer; Andrew W. Mellon Professor of Music and Composer-in-Residence, Carleton College: 1979.
 Leland Rice, photographer, Los Angeles, California: 1979.
 Lynn M. Riddiford, Professor of Zoology, University of Washington: 1979.
 Terry Riley, composer; Assistant Professor of Music, Mills College: 1979.
 John E. Roemer, Professor of Economics, University of California, Davis: 1979.
 Jack Roth, artist, Montclair, New Jersey; Emeritus Professor of Mathematics, Ramapo College of New Jersey: 1979.
 Gilbert F. Rozman, Musgrave Professor of Sociology, Princeton University: 1979.
 Thomas Savage, Writer: 1979.
 Angelo Savelli, deceased. Fine Arts: 1979.
 David Schickele, filmmaker, San Francisco: 1979.
 Stuart B. Schwartz, George Burton Adams Professor of History, Yale University: 1979.
 Kathleen L. Scott, Research Medievalist, Amherst, Massachusetts: 1979.
 Laurence Philip Senelick, Fletcher Professor of Drama and Oratory, Tufts University: 1979, 1987.
 Steven Shapin, Professor of Sociology and Science Studies, University of California, San Diego: 1979.
 James R. Shortridge, Professor of Geography, University of Kansas: 1979.
 Susan Shreve, Writer; Professor of English and Director of the Writing Program, George Mason University: 1979.
 Roberta Silman, writer, Ardsley, New York: 1979.
 Roberta G. Simmons, deceased. Sociology: 1979.
 John Peter Simons, Henry Eyring Professor of Chemistry, University of Utah: 1979.
 Jerome Herbert Skolnick, Professor of Law and Director, Center for the Study of Law and Society, University of California, Berkeley: 1979.
 Joel A. Smoller, Lamberto Cesari Chair, Professor of Mathematics, University of Michigan: 1979.
 Rosalind Solomon, photographer, New York City: 1979.
 Gary Soto, poet; Distinguished Professor of Creative Writing, University of California, Berkeley: 1979.
 Jonathan D. Spence, George B. Adams Professor of History, Yale University: 1979.
 H. Eugene Stanley, Professor of Physiology, Boston University School of Medicine, and Professor of Physics, Boston University: 1979.
 David Sudnow, writer, scholar, and musician, New York City: 1979.
 Frederick S. Szalay, Professor of Anthropology, Hunter College, City University of New York: 1979.
 Edward C. Taylor, A. Barton Hepburn Professor of Organic Chemistry, Princeton University: 1979.
 William B. Taylor, Professor of History, University of California, Berkeley: 1979.
 Laurence C. Thompson, Professor Emeritus of Linguistics, University of Hawaii at Manoa: 1979.
 Donald W. Tinkle, deceased. Biology: 1979.
 William Mills Todd, III, Curt Hugo Reisinger Professor of Slavic Languages and Literatures, and Professor of Comparative Literature, Harvard University: 1979.
 Franklin Toker, Professor of Architecture, University of Pittsburgh: 1979.
 Harold Troper, Professor of History, Ontario Institute for Studies in Education, University of Toronto: 1979.
 James W. Truran, Professor of Astrophysics, University of Illinois at Urbana-Champaign: 1979.
 Victor Twersky Professor (1966-1990) of Applied Mathematics; University of Illinois at Chicago: 1979.  (to work on biophysical applications of scattering theory)
 Stan VanDerBeek, deceased. Video: 1979.
 Tyll van Geel, Taylor Professor of Education, University of Rochester: 1979.
 John Van Seters, James A. Gray Professor of Biblical Literature, University of North Carolina at Chapel Hill: 1979.
 Hal R. Varian, Class of 1944 Chaired Professor and Dean, School of Information Management and Systems, University of California, Berkeley: 1979.
 B. Woody Vasulka, video artist, Santa Fe, New Mexico: 1979.
 Laurence Veysey, Professor Emeritus of History, University of California, Santa Cruz: 1979.
 William Weaver, Professor of Literature and Fellow, Bard Center, Bard College: 1979.
 Annette B. Weiner, deceased. Anthropology & Cultural Studies: 1979.
 Naomi Weisstein, Professor of Psychology, State University of New York at Buffalo: 1979.
 Allen Wier, writer; Professor of English, University of Tennessee: 1979.
 Kenneth G. Wilson, Hazel C. Youngberg Trustees Distinguished Professor of Physics, The Ohio State University, Columbus: 1979.
 Roy H. Winnick, writer, Princeton, New Jersey: 1979.
 Gary Witherspoon, Professor of Anthropology, University of Michigan: 1979.
 Irving N. Wohlfarth, Associate Professor of Comparative Literature, University of Oregon: 1979.
 Jack Keil Wolf, Stephen O. Rice Professor of Electrical and Computer Engineering, University of Massachusetts Amherst: 1979.
 Ruth Yeazell, Chace Family Professor of English, Yale University: 1979.
 William M. Yen, Graham Perdue Distinguished Professor of Physics, University of Georgia: 1979.
 Steven R. Yussen, Dean, College of Education, University of Iowa: 1979.

1979 Latin American and Caribbean Fellows
 Luis Aguirre, Professor of Petrology, University of Aix-Marseille III: 1979.
 José Pedro Barrán, historian, Montevideo: 1979.
 Héctor Bianciotti, writer, Paris, France: 1979.
 Natalio Rafael Botana, director, Center for Social Research, Torcuato Di Tella Institute, Buenos Aires: 1979.
 César L. Camacho Manco, Professor of Mathematics, Institute of Pure and Applied Mathematics, Rio de Janeiro, Brazil: 1979.
 Horacio E. Cingolani, Career Investigator, National University of La Plata School of Medicine: 1979.
 Alejandro Federico De Nicola, Career Scientist, National Research Council of Argentina; Research Scientist, Institute of Biology and Experimental Medicine, Buenos Aires; Adjunct Professor of Biological Chemistry, University of Buenos Aires School of Medicine: 1979.
 Jorge Edwards, writer, Santiago: 1979.
 Gilberto Carlos Gallopín, director, Ecological Systems Analysis Group, Bariloche Foundation, San Carlos de Bariloche: 1979.
 Leandro Katz, artist, Professor, Brown University, William Paterson University (retired), lives in Buenos Aires, Argentina: 1979.
 Maria Léa Salgado Labouriau, Professor, Department of Cellular Biology, University of Brazil: 1979.
 Donald Cuthbert Locke, artist, Atlanta, Georgia: 1979.
 Rolf Ricardo Mantel, deceased. Economics: 1979.
 Adolfo Martínez-Palomo, Director General, Center for Research and Advanced Studies, National Polytechnic Institute, Mexico City: 1979.
 Luis Millones, Professor Emeritus of Anthropology, National University of San Marcos, Peru: 1979.
 Benjamín Nahum, historian; Professor of Economic History, University of the Republic, Montevideo: 1979.
 Raúl Navarrete, deceased. Fiction: 1979.
 Guillermo Alberto O'Donnell, Helen Kellogg Professor of International Studies and Academic Director, Helen Kellogg Institute for International Studies, University of Notre Dame; Senior Researcher, Center for the Study of State and Society, Buenos Aires: 1979.
 Gonzalo Rojas, poet, Chillán, Chile: 1979.
 Luis Rafael Sánchez, writer; Professor of Literature, University of Puerto Rico, Rio Piedras: 1979.
 Alberto Juan Solari, Professor of Histology and Cell Biology, University of Buenos Aires School of Medicine: 1979.

References

External links
Guggenheim Fellows for 1979

See also
Guggenheim Fellowship

1979
1979 awards